The Indian Ford Bridge was one of nine metal highway bridges in Fulton County, Illinois listed on the National Register of Historic Places. It was added to the National Register of Historic Places on October 29, 1980, along with the eight other bridges, as one of the "Metal Highway Bridges of Fulton County." Some of the other bridges included London Mill's only other Registered Historic Place, the now demolished London Mills Bridge. Other demolished bridges include the Elrod Bridge, Duncan Mills Bridge and Buckeye Bridge.

Indian Ford Bridge is one of the five bridges submitted under the Fulton County Metal Highway Bridges Multiple Property Submission to have been demolished since its inclusion on the Register.

Indian Ford was a crossing of the Spoon River named by Job Babbit, an early Fulton County pioneer who helped survey a road from Farmington to Burlington in 1835 and named Union Township. According to Chapman's History of Fulton County (p. 886), Babbit discovered, where the road crossed the river, a trough made from an elm log that was fastened to the fork of a tree. It contained the skeletal remains of an American Indian.

See also
List of bridges documented by the Historic American Engineering Record in Illinois

Notes

External links
 

Bridges in Fulton County, Illinois
Road bridges in Illinois
Demolished bridges in the United States
Bridges completed in 1917
Historic American Engineering Record in Illinois
National Register of Historic Places in Fulton County, Illinois
Metal bridges in the United States
Truss bridges in the United States